The Story is the fourteenth and final studio album by the Scottish rock band Runrig, released on 29 January 2016 on Ridge Records.  The lead single, also titled "The Story", was released in November 2015. To promote the release of the album, a sizeable UK and Europe-wide tour was announced including a trademark Edinburgh Castle summer concert along with headlining the 21st HebCelt Festival on the Isle of Lewis.

The final track, "Somewhere", includes a tribute to astronaut Laurel Clark, who died in the Space Shuttle Columbia disaster. The song ends with a recording of her voice. Clark was a Runrig fan and had a wake up call with Runrig's "Running to the Light". She took a copy of their album The Stamping Ground into space with her. When the shuttle exploded the CD was found back on Earth, and was presented to the band by her family.

Track listing

Charts

References

2016 albums
Runrig albums